Titirangi can refer to:
Titirangi, a suburb of Waitakere, Auckland, New Zealand
Titirangi (hill), Gisborne, New Zealand, also known as Kaiti Hill
Titirangi (New Zealand electorate), former New Zealand Parliamentary electorate